Hostišovce is a village and municipality in the Rimavská Sobota District of the Banská Bystrica Region of southern Slovakia. To the cultural sightseeings belongs classical evangelical church with rococo interior.

History
In historical records the village was first mentioned in 1333 (1333 Geztus, 1368 Gesthes). In 1582 it was pillaged. Locals had been engaged in the production of weaving tools and wax.

Genealogical resources

The records for genealogical research are available at the state archive "Statny Archiv in Banska Bystrica, Slovakia"

 Lutheran church records (births/marriages/deaths): 1743-1841 (parish B)

See also
 List of municipalities and towns in Slovakia

References

External links
 
 
http://www.e-obce.sk/obec/hostisovce/4-kulturne_dedicstvo.html
Surnames of living people in Hostisovce

Villages and municipalities in Rimavská Sobota District